Streptomyces vietnamensis is a bacterium species from the genus of Streptomyces which has been isolated from forest soil in Vietnam.

See also 
 List of Streptomyces species

References

Further reading

External links
Type strain of Streptomyces vietnamensis at BacDive -  the Bacterial Diversity Metadatabase

vietnamensis
Bacteria described in 2007